Asarum canadense, commonly known as Canada wild ginger, Canadian snakeroot,  and broad-leaved asarabacca, is a herbaceous, perennial plant which forms dense colonies in the understory of deciduous forests throughout its native range in eastern North America, from the Great Plains east to the Atlantic Coast, and from southeastern Canada south to around the Fall Line in the southeastern United States.

It is protected as a state threatened species in Maine.

Description
Its leaves are kidney-shaped and persistent. Underground shoots are shallow-growing, fleshy rhizomes that branch to form a clump. Flowers bloom from April through June. Flowers are hairy and have three sepals. They are tan to purple in color on the outside and are lighter on the inside, with tapered tips and bases fused into a cup.

Pollinated flowers develop into a pod, which splits open when ripe to reveal seeds with elaiosomes, structures that are eaten by ants (myrmecochory).

The diploid chromosome number is 26.

Toxic substance
The plant contains aristolochic acid, a carcinogenic compound. The United States Food and Drug Administration warns that consumption of aristolochic acid-containing products is associated with "permanent kidney damage, sometimes resulting in kidney failure that has required kidney dialysis or kidney transplantation. In addition, some patients have developed certain types of cancers, most often occurring in the urinary tract."

Uses 
The long rhizomes of A. canadense were used by Native Americans as a seasoning. It has similar aromatic properties to true ginger (Zingiber officinale), but should not be used as a substitute because it contains an unknown concentration of the carcinogen aristolochic acid and asarone. The distillate from the ground root is known as Canadian snakeroot oil. The odor and flavor are spicy. It has been used in many flavor preparations.

Native Americans used the plant as a medicinal herb to treat a number of ailments including dysentery, digestive problems, swollen breasts, coughs and colds, typhus, scarlet fever, nerves, sore throats, cramps, heaves, earaches, headaches, convulsions, asthma, tuberculosis, urinary disorders, and venereal disease. In addition, they also used it as a stimulant or appetite enhancer, and as a charm. It was also used as an admixture to strengthen other herbal preparations.

References

External links

 
 
 

canadense
Groundcovers
Plants used in traditional Native American medicine
Plants described in 1753
Taxa named by Carl Linnaeus
Plants used in Native American cuisine
Flora of Canada
Flora of the United States
Abortifacients